Championa badeni is a species of beetle in the family Cerambycidae. It was described by Bates in 1892.

References

Heteropsini
Beetles described in 1892